Pilea tungurahuae is a species of plant in the family Urticaceae. It is endemic to Ecuador.  Its natural habitat is subtropical or tropical moist montane forests.

References

Endemic flora of Ecuador
tungurahuae
Endangered plants
Taxonomy articles created by Polbot